Ráby is a municipality and village in Pardubice District in the Pardubice Region of the Czech Republic. It has about 600 inhabitants.

The Kunětice Mountain with its Kunětice Mountain Castle lies in the municipality.

References

External links

Villages in Pardubice District